Kawardha State was one of the princely states in the Central Provinces of India during the period of the British Raj.  The capital of the state was Khairagarh town, in Kabirdham district of Chhattisgarh state. The Bhoramdeo Temple is located less than 20 km to the west of the main town.

History 

Kawardha State was founded in 1751. According to legend its name would have originated in Kabirdham, Kabir's see, the current name of the district. In former times many Kabir panth adherents resided in the town. The rulers were Gonds of the Raj Gond dynasty. 
Kawardha State's last ruler, Thakur Lal Dharamraj Singh, signed the accession to the Indian Union on 1 January 1948, so the state territory was merged into Bombay State, following its splits first assigned to Madhya Pradesh, finally to Chhattisgarh.

Ruling Thakurs 
The rulers of the princely state of Kawardha bore the title Thakur.
 1751 – 1801             Mahabali Singh  
 1801 – 1848             Ujiyar Singh 
 1848 – 1852             Tok Singh 
 c.1860             Baijnath Singh
 186?. – 1863            Ram Singh 
 1863 – 1864             Bahadur Singh 
 1864 – 1891             Rajpal Singh      (b. 1849 – d. ....) 
 1891 – 1920             Jadunath Singh    (b. 1885 – d. 19..) 
 4 February 1920 – 15 August 1947  Lal Dharamraj Singh  (b. 1910 – d. 1959)

See also 
 Eastern States Agency
 Chhattisgarh Division
 Political integration of India

References 

Princely states of Madhya Pradesh
States and territories disestablished in 1948
History of Chhattisgarh
Kabirdham district
Central Provinces
1948 disestablishments in India

ca:Kawardha